Zanjanbar (also Romanized as Zanjānbar and Zanjānebar; also known as Jehaq-e Pā’īn) is a village in Khorram Dasht Rural District, in the Central District of Kashan County, Isfahan Province, Iran. At the 2006 census, its population was 28, in 20 families.

References 

Populated places in Kashan County